Oey-Diemtigen railway station is a railway station in the municipality of Diemtigen, in the Swiss canton of Bern. It is an intermediate stop on the Spiez–Zweisimmen line and is served by local and regional trains.

Services 
The following services stop at Oey-Diemtigen:

 RegioExpress: eight trains per day to Zweisimmen and Spiez, with four trains continuing from Spiez to Interlaken Ost.
 Regio: hourly service to Zweisimmen and Bern.

References

External links 
 
 

Railway stations in the canton of Bern
BLS railway stations